Trnava District is a 
district in the Trnava Region of western Slovakia. In its present borders the district was established in 1996. Before that date Hlohovec district was a part of it. 
It comprises the villages around the Trnava, which forms an administrative, cultural and economy center of the district. The towns and villages are partly bedroom communities for the people who work in Bratislava, or Trnava.

Municipalities
Biely Kostol
Bíňovce
Bohdanovce nad Trnavou
Boleráz
Borová
Brestovany
Bučany
Buková
Cífer
Dechtice
Dlhá
Dobrá Voda
Dolná Krupá
Dolné Dubové
Dolné Lovčice
Dolné Orešany
Horná Krupá
Horné Dubové
Horné Orešany
Hrnčiarovce nad Parnou
Jaslovské Bohunice
Kátlovce
Košolná
Križovany nad Dudváhom
Lošonec
Majcichov
Malženice
Naháč
Opoj
Pavlice
Radošovce
Ružindol
Slovenská Nová Ves
Smolenice
Suchá nad Parnou
Šelpice
Špačince
Šúrovce
Trnava
Trstín
Vlčkovce
Voderady
Zavar
Zeleneč
Zvončín

References

 
Districts of Slovakia